Nadin can refer to:

 Nadin, a village in Dalmatia, Croatia
 Nadín Ospina, a Colombian artist
 Bob Nadin, a Canadian ice hockey referee
 Mihai Nadin, Romanian scholar
 Joanna Nadin, English writer
 NADIN, National Airspace Data Interchange Network - a somewhat obsolete X.25 network used for aviation in the US